Kuutarha is the debut album by Lau Nau. It was released in 2005 on Locust Records. The songs are sung completely in Finnish. 'Kuutarha' is Finnish for 'moongarden.'

Track listing
"Jos minulla olisi" – 3:53
"Kuula" – 4:14
"Pläkkikanteletar" – 4:33
"Tulkaa!" – 5:31
"Puuportti rautaportilta" – 4:09
"Johdattaja – Joleen" – 2:48
"Hunnun" – 4:38
"Kuljen halki kuutarhan" – 3:48
"Kivi murenee jolla kävelee " – 4:25
"Sammiolinnut" – 3:06

2005 albums